The Wisconsin Towns Association (WTA) is an organization of Wisconsin's 1,259 towns.  Founded in 1947, it is a non-profit and non-partisan association. It is based out of Shawano, Wisconsin.

WTA is separated into six districts.  WTA provides education, legal information, and grassroots legislative advocacy for towns statewide.

Notes

External links 

 Official website

 Towns
Shawano County, Wisconsin

Non-profit organizations based in Wisconsin